Kham Souk was king of the southern Laotian Kingdom of Champasak from 1863 to 1899. He was preceded by Kham Nay, who reigned from 1856 to 1858, and a period of interregnum from 1858 to 1863.

References

Kings of Champasak
19th-century Laotian people